Atkin is an English surname. Notable people with the surname include:

 A. O. L. Atkin (1925–2008), British mathematician
 Harvey Atkin (1942–2017), Canadian actor
 Isabel Atkin (born 1998), British-American skier
 James Atkin (1867–1944), British judge
 Jerry Atkin (born 1949), American businessman
 John Atkin (fl. 1980s), American politician
 Leon Atkin (1902–1976), British minister, human rights activist, and politician
 Paul Atkin (born 1969), English footballer
 Pete Atkin (born 1945), British singer-songwriter
 Ralph Atkin (born 1943), American businessman
 Robert Travers Atkin (1841–1872), Irish-Australian politician
 Tim Atkin, British journalist, broadcaster, and commentator
 Tommy Atkin (1906–1986), English footballer
 Victoria Atkin (born 1986), English actress
 Wendy Atkin (1947–2018), British professor

See also 
Atkin & Low family tree, showing the relationship between some of the above
 Sieve of Atkin, mathematical algorithm
 Atkins (disambiguation)
 Atkins (surname)
 Atkinson (disambiguation)
 Atkinson (surname)
 Aitken (disambiguation)
 Adkins
 Adkinson
 Watkin

English-language surnames